The Kingdom and the Beauty is a 1959 Hong Kong musical-drama film directed by Li Han-hsiang. The film was set in Imperial China, directed by a Hong Kong based-Mainland Chinese director and produced by the famed Hong Kong Shaw Brothers film studio. Although there was minimal Singaporean input in the film-making, the film was selected as the Singaporean entry for the Best Foreign Language Film at the 32nd Academy Awards, but was not nominated.

Cast
 Siu Loi Chow
 Lin Dai as Li Feng
 Li Jen Ho
 Bo Hong as Liu Jin
 Wei Hong as Li's sister-in-law
 King Hu as Ta Niu
 Jing Ting (singing voice)
 Wei Lieh Lan
 Lam Ma as Chou Yung
 Rhoqing Tang as Dowager Empress
 Margaret Tu Chuan as Village Girl
 Yuanlong Wang as Liang Chu
 Chih-Ching Yang as Li's brother
 Zhao Lei as Emperor Chu Te Cheng

See also
 List of submissions to the 32nd Academy Awards for Best Foreign Language Film
 List of Singaporean submissions for the Academy Award for Best Foreign Language Film
 Chinese Odyssey 2002, a 2002 film which spoofs this film

References

External links
 

1959 films
1959 drama films
Hong Kong drama films
1950s Mandarin-language films
Films directed by Li Han-hsiang
Huangmei opera films
1950s musical drama films
Films set in the 1st century BC